Dishu is a district in the south of Helmand Province, Afghanistan, bordering Pakistan. Its population, which is 80% Pashtun and 20% Baloch, was estimated at 19,900 in 2012. The district centre is the village of Dishu; most of the settlements in the district are along the Helmand River. The other important town is Bahramcha.

References

External links
 Map of Settlements AIMS, May 2002

Districts of Helmand Province